Mduduzi Fuzwayo (22 December 1986 – 8 January 2023) was a Zimbabwean cricketer. He made his first-class debut for Matabeleland Tuskers in the 2016–17 Logan Cup on 17 May 2017.

Fuzwayo died following a traffic collision on 8 January 2023, at the age of 36.

References

External links
 

1986 births
2023 deaths
Zimbabwean cricketers
Matabeleland Tuskers cricketers
Sportspeople from Bulawayo